NOW was a British weekly entertainment magazine printed between 1996 and 2019.

History and profile
NOW was launched in late 1996 as a less serious, more gossip-oriented magazine aimed at women. A series of high-profile celebrity relationships, such as between David and Victoria Beckham, and Jennifer Aniston and Brad Pitt provided ample material, while reality shows such as Big Brother and Pop Idol grew popular at just the right time to help fill pages. NOW was published by TI Media.

It was a mix of celebrity news, gossip and fashion and was primarily aimed at women. It also featured movie and music reviews, real-life stories, shopping and style feature together with major celebrity interviews.

The magazine had a circulation of 196,726 copies in the second part of 2013. Now's circulation fell to 126,921 in the second half of 2015.

By 2019, circulation had fallen for five years in a row and the decision was taken to close the magazine on 2 April 2019. The associated celebsnow.co.uk website continues.

References

External links
Website

1996 establishments in the United Kingdom
2019 disestablishments in the United Kingdom
Celebrity magazines published in the United Kingdom
Defunct magazines published in the United Kingdom
Entertainment magazines published in the United Kingdom
Magazines established in 1996
Magazines disestablished in 2019
News magazines published in the United Kingdom
Weekly magazines published in the United Kingdom